TI2 may refer to:
 The International 2012, a Dota 2 tournament
 Twilight Imperium: Second Edition, a 2000 board game